Jakob Maria Mierscheid MdB has been a fictitious politician in the German Bundestag since 11 December 1979. According to his official biography, he was born in Morbach/Hunsrück, a very rural constituency in Rhineland-Palatinate. He is Catholic and a member of the Social Democratic Party of Germany.

He is now a widely known curiosity within the Bundestag and uses Twitter as means of communication.

In 1983, the party magazine Vorwärts published an article purportedly written by Mierscheid claiming the discovery of a "law", the Mierscheid Law, that indicated a strong correlation between the election results of the SPD in national elections and West German steel production. 
The Bundestag official web site carries an ostensibly serious 'biography' and a photograph purporting to depict Mierscheid. In previous versions of the photograph, his fashion sense seemed very antiquated and his eyeglasses were added later. The current (2010) image shows a balding man sitting in a chair, facing away from the camera, in the middle of the empty Hall of Representatives. The German language version of the site lists 615 current names although the actual membership of the Bundestag is only 614, while the English and French language versions only list the actual membership of the Bundestag. Mierscheid has his own stationery and e-mail address and issues press releases now and then. The picture of Mierscheid at the Bundestag is based on the RTL Samstag Nacht character Karl Ranseier.

Mierscheid, Nagelmann, and Dräcker each have a long list of publications which have sometimes really been published in otherwise reputable media (science journals, parliament press).

Biography 
The biography of Jakob Maria Mierscheid is that of a backbencher with a list of humble career steps. The official biography of the German parliament lists him as a member of the Trade Union of Peasants and Lumberjacks, member of the Sport Friends Club (treasurer 1977-1982), honorary member of the Choral Society of the Trade Union for Wood and Plastics Workers. First listed as official delegate to the Social Democrat Party congress in Hannover 1960, Mierscheid first visited the West German capital in 1967.

In 1967–68, he wrote a four-part series about the "travel routes of the ring-tailed wood pigeons and its avionics" in the Central Journal of the Carrier Pigeon Breeder Association, reprinted 1969 in the Swiss-confederate journal "Homing Pigeon Correspondences". He entered the parliament in 1979.

His activities continued with an article in Vorwärts titled "The Solution: More market than corruption" published on 12 January 1985, and in 1993 he authored "Ecological data on the CFC replacement R134a" for the third Höchst Stone Louse Symposium in Frankfurt.

There are some approved biography books like that of Peter Raabe: Die Mierscheid-Akte. Dokumentarische Spuren eines Phantoms (The Mierscheid File: Documentary Traces of a Phantom). Later Dietrich Sperling and Friedhelm Wollner published Jakob Mierscheid, Aus dem Leben eines Abgeordneten: Eine politische Holografie (Jakob Mierscheid, from the Life of a Member of Parliament: A Political Holography) in 1998.

On 11 December 2004, Mierscheid celebrated his 25th anniversary as member of the Bundestag. On 1 March 2013, the President of the German Bundestag, Mr. Norbert Lammert, said an official congratulation on occasion of Mierscheid's 80th birthday. Mierscheid did not show up to a reception given in his honour in his home-town of Morbach.

In July 2005, the German Tagesschau announced the exit of Mierscheid from SPD to the German Linkspartei and WASG. Mierscheid's angry dementi was announced both by the Tagesschau, and an interview in Der Spiegel.

After the parliament moved to Berlin, two new office buildings for members of parliament were connected with a pedestrian bridge over the Spree river. This bridge was nicknamed the "Mierscheid Bridge". Attempts to mark it with an official plate were said to have failed because "the nails were nuts" (pun on Niete meaning nut/rivet, a blank in lottery or a person that is unable to accomplish anything).

After the historic defeat in the 2009 election, Mierscheid quoted Alfred, Lord Tennyson's poem "Ulysses" in German to raise the spirits of his comrades in the Bundestag.

Tho' much is taken, much abides; and tho'
We are not now that strength which in old days
Moved earth and heaven; that which we are, we are;
One equal temper of heroic hearts,
Made weak by time and fate, but strong in will
To strive, to seek, to find, and not to yield.

Further appreciation 
On Mierscheid’s 80th "birthday" in 2013, his alleged home town Morbach opened a hiking trail, a roundtrip of about 16 km (10 miles), providing humorous reflections on Mierscheid’s life and political activities on 14 information boards along the trail.

Notes

References

Further reading

External links
 Mierscheid weblog
  Twitter of Mierscheid
 
 

Fictional German politicians
Nonexistent people used in jokes
Members of the Bundestag for Rhineland-Palatinate
Social Democratic Party of Germany politicians
Fictional characters from Rhineland-Palatinate